Mustafa Ejubović (1651 – 16 July 1707), also known as Šejh Jujo, was a Bosnian historian, writer and Mufti of Ottoman Bosnia and Herzegovina.

Biography
Mustafa Ejubović was born in a Bosniak family in the Herzegovinian town of Mostar in 1651. His father Jusuf was a distinguished professor. Young Mustafa taught maktab and madrasa in Mostar before departing for Constantinople to study in 1677. There he listened to lectures on philosophy, astronomy and mathematics. When he graduated, he got a professorship at a lower madrasa in Constantinople, became famous for his lectures, and soon began to teach. Ejubović wrote 27 treatises on logic during his lifetime. In addition to his native Bosnian language, he also spoke Arabic, Turkish and Persian.

Upon his return to Bosnia, Ejubović became the Mufti of Mostar in 1692.
He died on 16 July 1707 in his hometown.

References

External links 
 Modos.ba

1651 births
1707 deaths
Writers from Mostar
Bosniaks of Bosnia and Herzegovina
Cultural historians
17th-century historians from the Ottoman Empire
Codicologists